Pratap Singh I, popularly known as Maharana Pratap (c. 9 May 1540 – 19 January 1597), was a Hindu Rajput king of Mewar from the Sisodia dynasty. Pratap became a folk hero for his military resistance against the expansionism of the Mughal Empire under Akbar through guerrilla warfare which proved inspirational for later rebels against Mughals including Shivaji.

Early life and accession 
Maharana Pratap was born to Udai Singh II of Mewar and Jaiwanta Bai. His younger brothers were Shakti Singh, Vikram Singh and Jagmal Singh. Pratap also had 2 stepsisters: Chand Kanwar and Man Kanwar. He was married to Maharani Ajabde Punwar of Bijolia  Amar Singh I. He belonged to the Royal Family of Mewar. After the death of Udai Singh in 1572, Rani Dheer Bai wanted her son Jagmal to succeed him but senior courtiers preferred Pratap, as the eldest son, to be their king. The desire of the nobles prevailed. Udai Singh died in 1572, and Prince Pratap ascended the throne as Maharana Pratap, the 54th ruler of Mewar in the line of the Sisodia Rajputs. Jagmal swore revenge and left for Ajmer, to join the armies of Akbar, and obtained the town of Jahazpur as a Jagir as a gift in return for his help.

Military career

Background 
In stark contrast to other Rajput rulers who accommodated and formed alliances with the various Muslim dynasties in the subcontinent, the state of Mewar, led by Pratap Singh, gained distinction for its refusal to form any political alliance with the Mughal Empire and its resistance to Muslim domination. The conflicts between Pratap Singh and Akbar led to the Battle of Haldighati.

Battle of Haldighati

The bloody Siege of Chittorgarh in 1567-1568 had led to the loss of the fertile eastern belt of Mewar to the Mughals. However, the rest of the wooded and hilly kingdom in the Aravalli range was still under the control of Maharana Pratap. Mughal Emperor Akbar was intent on securing a stable route to Gujarat through Mewar; when Pratap Singh was crowned king (Maharana) in 1572, Akbar sent a number of envoys, including one by Raja Man Singh of Amer, entreating him to become a vassal like many other rulers in Rajputana. When Pratap refused to personally submit to Akbar, war became inevitable.

The Battle of Haldighati was fought on 18 June 1576 between Pratap Singh and Mughal forces led by Man Singh I of Amer. The Mughals were victorious and inflicted significant casualties among the Mewaris but failed to capture Maharana Pratap. The site of the battle was a narrow mountain pass at Haldighati near Gogunda, modern day Rajsamand in Rajasthan. Pratap Singh fielded a force of around 3000 cavalry and 400 Bhil archers. The Mughals were led by Man Singh of Amer, who commanded an army numbering around 10,000 men. After a fierce battle lasting more than three hours, Pratap found himself wounded and the day lost. He managed to retreat to the hills and lived to fight another day.

Haldighati was a futile victory for the Mughals, as they were unable to kill or capture Pratap, or any of his close family members in Udaipur. While the sources also claim that Pratap was able to make a successful escape, Mansingh managed to conquer Gogunda within a week after Haldighati then ended his campaign. Subsequently, Akbar himself led a sustained campaign against the Rana in September 1576, and soon, Gogunda, Udaipur, and Kumbhalgarh were all under Mughal control.

Reconquest of Mewar
Mughal pressure on Mewar relaxed after 1579 following rebellions in Bengal and Bihar and Mirza Hakim's incursion into the Punjab. After this, Akbar sent Abdul Rahim Khan-i-Khanan to invade Mewar but he stopped at Ajmer. In 1582, Pratap Singh attacked and occupied the Mughal post at Dewair (or Dewar) in the Battle of Dewair. This led to the automatic liquidation of all 36 Mughal military outposts in Mewar. After this Akbar sent Jagannath Kachhwaha to invade Mewar in 1584. This time too Mewar army defeated Mughals and forced them to retreat. In 1585, Akbar moved to Lahore and remained there for the next twelve years watching the situation in the north-west. No major Mughal expedition was sent to Mewar during this period. Taking advantage of the situation, Pratap recovered most of Mewar (except its former capital), Chittorgarh and Mandalgarh regions by defeating Mughal forces there. During this period, he also built a new capital, Chavand, near modern Dungarpur.

Patronage of art
Maharana Pratap's court at Chavand had given shelter to many poets, artists, writers and artisans. The Chavand school of art was developed during the reign of Rana Pratap.

Revival of Mewar
Maharana Pratap took refuge in the Chappan area and started attacking the Mughal strongholds. By 1583 he had successfully captured western Mewar, which included Dewar, Amet, Madariya, Zawar and the fort of Kumbalgarh. He then made Chavand his capital and constructed a Chamunda mata temple there. The Maharana was able to live in peace for a short time and started establishing order in Mewar. From 1585 till his death, the Rana had recovered a large part of Mewar. The citizens who had migrated out of Mewar started returning during this time. There was good monsoon which helped to revive the agriculture of Mewar. The economy also started getting better and trade in the area started increasing. The Rana was able to capture the territories west of Chittor but could not fulfill his dream of capturing Chittor itself.

Death
Reportedly, Pratap died of injuries sustained in a hunting accident, at Chavand on 19 January 1597, aged 56. He was succeeded by his eldest son, Amar Singh I. On his death bed, Pratap told his son never to submit to the Mughals and to win Chittor back.

Legacy

Maharana Pratap is a prominent figure in both folk and contemporary Rajasthani culture and is viewed as a celebrated warrior in that state, as well as in India as a whole.

Historian Satish Chandra notes –

Bandyopadhyay also seconds Satish Chandra's view with the observation that 
{{Blockquote|
Pratap's successful defiance of Mughals using guerrilla strategy also proved inspirational to figures ranging from Emperor Shivaji to anti-British revolutionaries in Bengal.}}

In 2007, a statue of Maharana Pratap was unveiled by former President Pratibha Patil in the Parliament of India.

In popular culture
Film and television
 1925: Rana Pratap 1929: Mewad Nu Moti 1946: Maharana Pratap 1958: Chetak Aur Rana Pratap, about the bonding with his warhorse Chetak.
 1961:Jai Chitod
 1988–1989: Bharat Ek Khoj, broadcast on Doordarshan, where he was played by Puneet Issar.
 1993: Chetak 1997–1998: Maharana Pratap 2010: Chetak – The Wonder Horse 2012: Maharana Pratap: The First Freedom Fighter 2013–2015: Jodha Akbar, broadcast on Zee TV, where he was played by Anurag Sharma
 2013–2015: Bharat Ka Veer Putra – Maharana Pratap, broadcast by Sony Entertainment Television (India), where he was portrayed by Faisal Khan and Sharad Malhotra
 2016: ABP News presented Bharatvarsha'', in which episode 8 showcased the story of Maharana Pratap.
 2023: Deepraj Rana as Maharana Pratap in Webseries Taj: Divided by Blood on Zee5

See also 

 Rajput resistance to Muslim conquests
 Udaipur State
Durgadas Rathore

References

41

Sources

External links

 Official Website for the Royal Family of Udaipur

 
Singh, Pratap
Singh, Pratap
Rajput rulers
Rajasthani people
History of Rajasthan
16th-century Indian monarchs
Accidental deaths in India
Hunting accident deaths
History of Udaipur
Hindu monarchs
Mewar dynasty
Indian Hindus